São Martinho (Portuguese for "Saint Martin") may refer to the following places:

Places

In Angola
São Martinho dos Tigres

In Brazil
São Martinho, Rio Grande do Sul
São Martinho, Santa Catarina

In Portugal
São Martinho das Amoreiras, a parish in the municipality of Odemira
São Martinho do Porto, a parish in the municipality of Alcobaça 
São Martinho de Angueira, a parish in the municipality of Miranda do Douro
São Martinho (Alcácer do Sal), a parish in the municipality of Alcácer do Sal 
São Martinho (Covilhã), a parish in the municipality of Covilhã
São Martinho (Seia), a parish in the municipality of Seia
São Martinho (Sintra), a parish in the municipality of Sintra
São Martinho (Funchal), a parish in the municipality of Funchal, Madeira
São Martinho River, a river that is a tributary of the Sado River in Portugal

Other
São Martinho, Portuguese Navy galleon